William And The Brains Trust is the twenty-fifth book in the Just William series by Richmal Crompton. It was first published in 1945. It was republished as a paperback (abridged) under the title "William the Hero."

Stories
"William And The Brains Trust"
"Mrs Bott's Birthday Present"
"William And The Mock Invasion"
"William's War-Time Fun Fair"
"William and the Tea-Cake"
"Entertainment Provided"
"The Outlaws' Report"
"Soldiers For Sale"
"Youth On The Prow"
"Aunt Florence, Toy-Maker"
"Feasts For Heroes"
"William Goes Fruit-Picking"

References

1945 short story collections
Just William
Short story collections by Richmal Crompton
Children's short story collections
1945 children's books